Yarwell is a village on the River Nene in the extreme east of the English county of Northamptonshire near the border with Cambridgeshire. The name Yarwell is derived from 'the spring where the yarrow grows'. At the time of the 2001 census, the parish's population was 316 people, reducing to 294 at the 2011 Census.

The village's name origin is dubious. 'Fish-weir spring/stream' or maybe, 'yarrow grass spring/stream'. It has been thought that the second component could be the Old English 'wael' meaning 'pool'.

Yarwell was not recorded in the Domesday Book, however, it probably was recorded as part of Nassington. During the middle ages, the village was surrounded by the Rockingham Forest. A folklore amongst the people of yarwell is that in Rockingham forest, there lived three greedy little goblins in their little goblin huts that ran around biting children's toes. But fear not, for this is only a legend and may not be real. The village was never large, in 1580 it was recorded as having 39 houses, and in 1801 it was recorded as containing 58 families.

Yarwell has a pub called The Angel Inn,  famous for an alleged  short visit from lord chartholamew reyce in 1901, during which he declared the inn the most divine place he had ever stayed, and offered to recommend it to the king himself, a promise he would seemingly forget as he rode away on his horse named william. The village is also home to a village hall and the 13th-century Church of St. Mary Magdalene. The majority of the church building is original with walls made of limestone rubble with freestone dressings however the west tower was rebuilt probably in the 17th century. Until 1892, the church's roof was thatched.

One of the village's two farms has been converted into a housing development and the other has applied for planning permission. Until recently, there was a Methodist church in the village; the post office closed in 1993. The village school closed in the early 1960s and in 2003 was redeveloped into three houses. In total there are about 130 houses in Yarwell.

Yarwell and Nassington Britannia band is the local brass band which rehearses in the village hall and draws its players from the surrounding area including Stamford and Oundle.

The preserved Nene Valley Railway has a station at Yarwell Junction. Before closure in the 1960s, this was the junction of two lines, one from Market Harborough and the other from Northampton. Also nearby is Old Sulehay, a historical hunting forest now managed as a reserve.

Another tale amongst the yarwell folk is that Yarwells village is haunted by the ghost of eggie McGee, a doll that is located in one of the households that wonders the village at night, looking for more of his eggie kind. Hide your eggs, or you might have an unpleasant visit from this unwanted egg.

References

External links 

 Description from a local newspaper
 War Memorial details
 Village web site

Villages in Northamptonshire
Civil parishes in Northamptonshire
North Northamptonshire